Klemmes Corner is an unincorporated community in Highland Township, Franklin County, Indiana.

History
Klemmes Corner received its name from a store Albert Klemme kept there. Klemmes Corner had a post office under the name Blue Creek. The Blue Creek post office was in operation from 1849 until 1904.

Geography

References

Unincorporated communities in Franklin County, Indiana
Unincorporated communities in Indiana